Maurice Stein may refer to:

 Maurice B. Stein (1918–1976), owner of the summer camp Camp Echo Lake (New York)
 Maurice R. Stein (born 1926), American sociologist and innovator in higher education
 Maurice Stein (gendarme) (1884-1957), Luxembourgish Captain

See also
 Maurice Steijn (born 1973), Dutch football manager and former footballer